The Maine Senate is the upper house of the Maine Legislature, the state legislature of the U.S. state of Maine. The Senate currently consists of 35 members representing an equal number of districts across the state, though the Maine Constitution allows for "an odd number of Senators, not less than 31 nor more than 35". Unlike the lower House, the Senate does not set aside nonvoting seats for Native tribes.  Because it is a part-time position, members of the Maine Senate usually have outside employment as well.

The Senate meets at the Maine State House in Augusta. Members are limited to four consecutive terms with each term being two years but may run again after a two-year wait.

Leadership
Unlike many U.S. states, the Senate's leader is not the lieutenant governor, as Maine does not have a lieutenant governor. Instead, the Senate chooses its own president, who is also the first in the line of gubernatorial succession.

Composition of the 131st (2022-2024) Maine Senate

Officers

Members of the Maine Senate
Districts are currently numbered starting with 1 from north to south.  While this is often reversed in the decennial redistricting, it was not reversed in the redistricting which occurred in 2021 and which went into effect beginning with the 2022 primary and general elections.  The previous district lines, which were drawn in 2013 and were first used in the 2014 primary and general elections, were only in effect for 8 years rather than the usual 10 as Maine adjusted its legislative redistricting cycle to conform with most other states.

↑ denotes that the Senator first won in a special election

Past composition of the Senate

Notes

References

External links
The Maine Senate official government website

Maine Legislature
State upper houses in the United States